Lynch Family Skatepark is a skate park operated by the Department of Conservation and Recreation located in Cambridge, Massachusetts. Built on land that was originally used for the Big Dig, the park has found support from Nancy Schon, who found her tortoise and hare sculptures being used in Copley Square by skateboarders who had nowhere else to practice.

References

External links
 

Geography of Cambridge, Massachusetts
State parks of Massachusetts
Skateparks in the United States
Tourist attractions in Cambridge, Massachusetts